Franz Upham Burkett (October 24, 1887January 23, 1961) was an American lawyer and politician from Maine. A Republican from Portland, he served five terms in the Maine Legislature, including four in the [[Maine House of Representatives (19291934; 19511952} and one in the Maine Senate (19351936). During the 19331934 session, he was elected Speaker of the Maine House of Representatives. From 19371940, he served as Maine Attorney General.

Burkett was born in Union, Maine as the son of Fred E. Burkett and Lina M. Upham Burkett. His father was a member of the Maine House of Representatives. He attended Maine Wesleyan Seminary and graduated from Bowdoin College in 1911. He then worked as a teacher at Union High School before studying at the University of Maine School of Law. There he earned a Bachelor of Laws in 1916. After graduation, he served as a lieutenant in the First World War. After returning from the war, Burkett practiced law in Cumberland County. In 1929, both he and his father were elected to the House of Representatives, which was the first time a father and son had served concurrently.

References

1887 births
1961 deaths
People from Union, Maine
Politicians from Portland, Maine
Bowdoin College alumni
University of Maine School of Law alumni
Lawyers from Portland, Maine
American military personnel of World War I
Republican Party members of the Maine House of Representatives
Speakers of the Maine House of Representatives
Republican Party Maine state senators
Maine Attorneys General
20th-century American politicians
20th-century American lawyers